Paula was a barque built in 1876 in Hammelwarden, Germany. 

She participated in a  experiment investigating ocean currents by means of distributing messages in bottles. A bottle dropped by Paula in the Indian Ocean in 1886 was discovered in January 2018 north of Wedge Island, Western Australia.

Description
She was assessed at 515 tons bom, . She was rigged as a barque.

History

Paula was built in April 1876 at the Lüring Yard, Hammelwarden, Germany for A Schiff & Co. The Code Letters NFKG and German Official Number 4277 were allocated. Her port of registry was Elsfleth. Paula was last listed in the American shipping registers in 1890. She was not listed in 1891.

Message in a bottle find

On 12 June 1886, a message in a bottle was dropped from Paula during a voyage from Cardiff, Wales, United Kingdom to Makassar, Dutch East Indies. The finders contacted the Western Australian Museum who investigated the discovery. They reported that the bottle had been dropped as part of an experiment by the German Naval Observatory (Deutsche Seewarte) to determine ocean currents. The bottle and its message were analysed and found to be authentic to the period. The hand-made bottle had originally contained jenever and had come from Schiedam, South Holland, Netherlands. The previous discovery of a bottle from the programme had been in January 1934 in Denmark. The 131 year time-to-retrieval exceeds the Guinness Book of Records-listed record for the longest such time of 108 years.

References

1876 ships
Sailing ships of the German Empire
Merchant ships of Germany
2018 in Australia
Barques